Atal Pension Yojana (APY, translation: Atal's Pension Scheme), formerly known as Swavalamban Yojana (SY, translation: Self-Support Scheme) is a government-backed pension scheme in India, primarily targeted at the unorganised sector. It was mentioned in the year 2015 Budget speech by the Finance Minister Arun Jaitley. It was launched by Prime Minister Narendra Modi on 9 May 2015 in Kolkata.

History
Swavalamban Yojana was a government-backed pension scheme targeted at the unorganised sector in India. It was applicable to all citizens in the unorganised sector who joined the National Pension Scheme (NPS) administered by the Pension Fund Regulatory and Development Authority (PFRDA) Act 2013.

The scheme was announced by the Finance Minister in Budget 2010–11. It was funded by grants from the Government of India.

This scheme was named after Atal Bihari Vajpayee, former prime minister of India.

Scheme
Only subscribers who had enrolled in APY between 1 June 2015 and 31 March 2016, and were not beneficiaries of any social security schemes, besides not having any taxable income were eligible for this co-contribution.

The minimum eligible age for a person to join APY is 18 years and the maximum is 40 years. An enrolled person would start receiving pension on attaining the age of 60 years. Therefore, a minimum period of contribution by the subscriber under APY would be 20 years or more. The national Aadhaar ID number is the primary "know your customer" document for identification of beneficiaries, spouses, and nominees to avoid entitlement-related disputes in the long-term. For proof of address, an individual may submit a copy of their ration card or bank passbook.

Subscribers can opt to decrease or increase pension amount during the course of the accumulation phase, as per the available monthly pension amounts. However, the option to switch is only provided once a year during the month of April.

This scheme will be linked to the bank accounts opened under the Pradhan Mantri Jan Dhan Yojana scheme and the contributions will be deducted automatically.

Subscribers & subscription amount

 The figure is not specified precisely, it is approximate.

Post-Covid-19, the number of beneficiaries joining the Atal Pension Scheme has increased. More than 90 lakh people joined in 2021 and more than 1.2 crore people joined in 2021.

See also
 Pradhan Mantri Jan Dhan Yojana
 Pradhan Mantri Suraksha Bima Yojana
 Pradhan Mantri Jeevan Jyoti Bima Yojana

References

External links
 

Modi administration initiatives
Government schemes in India
Social security in India
Pensions in India
2015 introductions
2015 in India
Memorials to Atal Bihari Vajpayee
2015 establishments in India